Calavos is a rural locality in the Bundaberg Region, Queensland, Australia.

Geography 
Calavos is low-lying farming land to the south of the city of Bundaberg. The Elliott River forms its southern boundary and the locality is well-watered by a number of creeks that are tributaries of the river. The predominant land use is growing sugarcane; there is a network of cane tramways to carry the harvest to the sugar mills.

There is a prawn farm operating on the northern bank of the river. Established in 1996, it produced its first harvest of black tiger prawns in 1997.

References

Further reading 

 

Bundaberg Region
Localities in Queensland